Pierre Robin (born 1 November 1982) is a French judoka.

Achievements

External links
 

1982 births
Living people
French male judoka
21st-century French people